The 28th Alberta Legislative Assembly was in session from May 23, 2012, to April 7, 2015, with the membership of the assembly determined by the results of the 2012 Alberta general election held on April 23, 2012. The Legislature officially resumed on May 23, 2012, and continued until the third session was prorogued and dissolved on April 7, 2015, prior to the 2015 Alberta general election on May 5, 2015.

Alberta's twenty-sixth government was controlled by the majority Progressive Conservative Association of Alberta, led by Premier Alison Redford until her resignation on March 23, 2014, and subsequently led by Dave Hancock temporarily until Jim Prentice was confirmed leader of the Progressive Conservatives in September. The Official Opposition was led by Danielle Smith of the Wildrose Party until she crossed the floor to join the PCs, and the opposition was subsequently led by Heather Forsyth. The Speaker was Gene Zwozdesky.

Bills

The Public Service Salary Restraint Act (informally referred to as Bill 46) is an Act of the Legislature of Alberta passed in 2013. The Bill was introduced in 2013 by Finance Minister Doug Horner. The bill passed first, second, and third readings and went into effect on December 11, 2013. The law applies only to negotiations with the province's largest public-sector union, the Alberta Union of Provincial Employees (AUPE). 

In February 2014 Court of Queen's Bench Justice Denny Thomas granted an indefinite injunction against the Bill saying "the legislation could irreparably harm labour relations, guts the collective bargaining process and effectively emasculates the AUPE".

On April 28, 2014, details emerged of a deal reached between the Hancock government and the AUPE. The tentative agreement called for a lump-sum payment of $1,850 the first year followed by pay increases totalling 6.75 per cent over three years. Members of the AUPE will vote on the agreement in June 2014 before the government ratifies it.

The deal was announced Monday, the same day the government dropped its appeal of an injunction the union won against legislation that would have imposed an austere contract similar to ones that went into effect last year for Alberta physicians and teachers.

Membership in the 28th Alberta Legislative Assembly

Seating plan

As of March 2014

Official Seating Plan (Retrieved March 17, 2014)

In the final year of the 28th Assembly, the seating plan changed drastically due to floor-crossing and new party leaders for all four recognized parties.

As of March 2015

Standings changes since the 28th general election

After the defections of 11 Wildrose MLA's, the Liberals and Wildrose were tied at 5 seats each, but the Speaker ruled that Wildrose would continue as the Official Opposition, a status that carries additional funding and privileges.

References

External links
 Alberta Legislative Assembly

28th Alberta Legislature
2012 in Canadian politics
2013 in Canadian politics
2014 in Canadian politics
2015 in Canadian politics
Legislature, 28
Legislature, 28
Legislature, 28
Legislature, 28